Eisenhower Park is a park in East Meadow, New York.

Eisenhower Park or Dwight D. Eisenhower Park may also refer to:

Eisenhower State Park (Kansas), in Osage County, Kansas
Eisenhower State Park (Texas), near Denison, Texas
Eisenhower National Historic Site, in Gettysburg, Pennsylvania
Eisenhower Birthplace State Historic Site, in Denison, Texas
Dwight D. Eisenhower Park (Houston), in Houston, Texas
Dwight D. Eisenhower Park (San Antonio), a city park in San Antonio, Texas
Eisenhower Park, a city park in Augusta, Georgia

See also
 Eisenhower Parkway, Essex County, New Jersey